is a private junior college in Yokosuka, Kanagawa Prefecture, Japan, established in 1952.

After the 1923 Great Kantō earthquake, it relocated to Shinagawa. It relocated again to Ota-ku, Tokyo in 1933, and to its present location in Yokosuka in 1964 as the Kanagawa Dental College. The junior college was established in 1952, and shares the same campus. The primary aspect of its curriculum is to provide the commercial, legal and communications skills for a successful dental practice.

Faculties 
 Faculty of Dental Hygiene
 Faculty of Nursing

See also
 Kanagawa Dental University

External links
  

Educational institutions established in 1910
Private universities and colleges in Japan
Japanese junior colleges
Universities and colleges in Kanagawa Prefecture
Buildings and structures in Yokosuka, Kanagawa
1910 establishments in Japan